Horto is a Belo Horizonte Metro station on Line 1. It was opened in December 1992 as a one-station extension of the line from Santa Efigênia; later, Santa Tereza was added in the middle of this extension. In December 1994, the line was extended to Santa Inês. The station is located between Santa Tereza and Santa Inês.

References

Belo Horizonte Metro stations
1992 establishments in Brazil
Railway stations opened in 1992